Ship of Wanted Men is a 1933 American pre-Code crime film directed by Lewis D. Collins and starring Dorothy Sebastian, Fred Kohler and Leon Ames. The film's sets were designed by the art director Fred Preble.

Synopsis
A gang of fugitives hijack a ship and make for a Pacific island that has no extradition treaty with the United States.

Cast
 Dorothy Sebastian as Irene Reynolds 
 Fred Kohler as Chuck Young 
 Leon Ames as Capt. John Holden 
 Gertrude Astor as Vera 
 Maurice Black as George Spinoli 
 James Flavin as Frank Busch 
 Jason Robards Sr. as John Craig 
 Herbert Evans as Duke Finley 
 John Ince as Elderly Man 
 Kit Guard as Crewman 
 George 'Gabby' Hayes as Crewman

References

Bibliography
 Michael R. Pitts. Poverty Row Studios, 1929–1940: An Illustrated History of 55 Independent Film Companies, with a Filmography for Each. McFarland & Company, 2005.

External links
 

1933 films
1933 crime films
1930s English-language films
American crime films
Seafaring films
Films directed by Lewis D. Collins
1930s American films